Ligniera is a protist genus of the family Plasmodiophoraceae.

The genus name of Ligniera is in honour of Élie Antoine Octave Lignier (1855–1916), who was a French botanist, known for his work in the field of paleobotany.

References

Further reading 
 
 
 
 
 
 
 
 

Endomyxa